The Imperial Austrian Order of Elizabeth (German: Kaiserlich österreichischer Elisabeth-Orden), founded in 1898 by Francis Joseph, Emperor of Austria and King of Hungary, was an order created for women. The order was the namesake of Saint Elisabeth of Hungary, but it was created to honor and memorialize Franz Joseph's late wife, Empress-Queen Elisabeth.

The order was divided into three classes: Grand Cross, first and second classes.  There was also an Elizabeth Medal for civil merit.

The Order
According to medal expert and collector Yuri Yashnev:
The award was intended for ladies, regardless of social status or religion, for merits in religious and charitable work. The award had four degrees - the Grand Cross, I Degree and II Degree, and also a cross of merit... Awards were made, personally, by the emperor... the badges and insignia of the Order were to be returned to the state upon the death of the member, or upon the advancement from a lower degree to a higher degree... There were 81 awards of the Grand Cross, 332 awards of the I Degree, 500 awards of the II Degree, and 208 awards of the Elizabeth Medal for merit, between 1898 and 1918, when the Order was disbanded with the collapse of the monarchy.

Notable recipients

Austrian

 Archduchess Gisela of Austria
 Princess Isabella of Croÿ
 Archduchess Maria Annunciata of Austria
 Maria Christina of Austria
 Archduchess Marie Valerie of Austria
 Sophie, Duchess of Hohenberg
 Irma Sztáray

Foreign

 Alexandra of Denmark
 Augusta Viktoria, German Empress
 Duchess Cecilie of Mecklenburg-Schwerin
 Charlotte of Schaumburg-Lippe
 Emma of Waldeck and Pyrmont
 Princess Irene of Hesse and by Rhine
 Duchess Marie of Mecklenburg-Schwerin
 Marie, Queen of Romania
 Mary of Teck
 Milena of Montenegro
 Stephanie of Belgium
 Princess Thyra of Denmark
 Victoria of Baden
 Victoria Eugenie, Queen of Spain
 Anne Weightman
 Wilhelmina of the Netherlands

Sources

Order of Elizabeth
Elizabeth, Imperial Austrian Order of
Awards established in 1898
1918 disestablishments in Austria-Hungary
1898 establishments in Austria-Hungary
Empress Elisabeth of Austria